The Paddy Museum is a museum in Alor Setar, Kota Setar, Kedah, Malaysia.

History

The museum was constructed on a land belonged to the Malaysian Agricultural Development Authority at a cost of MYR24.7 million. It was inaugurated and opened on 12 October 2004 by Kedah Sultan Abdul Halim.

Architecture
The museum is a 3-story building with a total area of 12,000 m2. It resembles bushels of harvested rice stalks decorated with rice motifs. The murals on the museum wall was done by 60 artists from North Korea.

Exhibitions
The museum exhibits paddy cultivation process in Malaysia and the tools and equipment for the process over the past decades.

See also
 List of museums in Malaysia
 Agriculture in Malaysia

References

2004 establishments in Malaysia
Kota Setar District
Museums established in 2004
Museums in Malaysia